Jeena Yahan is a 1979 Bollywood film, directed by Basu Chatterjee and produced by N.P. Ali under Jamu Pictures. The film is based on story 
Ekhane Aakash Neyi by Manu Bhandari.

Cast
Shekhar Kapur
Shabana Azmi
Dina Pathak
Sunder
Purohit
Arvind Deshpande
Devendra Khandelwal  (as Devendra)
Kiran Vairale
V.K. Pathak
Amol Palekar ...  Guest appearance
Zarina Wahab ...  Guest appearance
Vidya Sinha ...  Guest appearance
Desh Maheshwari as Shankar

Music
The music of the film was composed by Salil Chowdhury, while lyrics were penned by Yogesh.

"Hum Nahi Dukh Se Ghabraye" - Lata Mangeshkar, KJ Yesudas
"Shaam Aayi Hai" - Lata Mangeshkar
"Yehi To Hai Meri" - Sabita Chowdhury

References

External links
 

1979 films
1970s Hindi-language films
Films directed by Basu Chatterjee
Films scored by Salil Chowdhury
Films based on short fiction